Exploding Kittens is a casual dedicated deck card game designed by Matthew Inman of The Oatmeal webcomic, Elan Lee and Shane Small, and first published by The Oatmeal in 2015. Beginning as a Kickstarter project seeking US$10,000 in crowdfunding, it exceeded its goal in eight minutes.

On January 27, 2015, after seven days, it passed 103,000 backers setting the record for the most backers in Kickstarter history. At completion on February 19, 2015, it had US$8,782,571 in pledges by 219,382 backers. The campaign ended as the fourth most-funded campaign on the crowdfunding site. 

The first play test of Exploding Kittens was recorded on YouTube by Smosh Games, who had the first deck. Delivery to backers started in late July 2015; all backers received the game by September 2015. Exploding Kittens is described as a “strategic card game about cats and destruction”.

Gameplay 

All cards are put into a deck, except for the Defuse and Exploding Kitten cards. The deck is shuffled and each player draws 4 cards and takes a Defuse card. The Exploding Kitten cards are then shuffled back into the deck so that the number of Exploding Kitten cards in the deck is one less than the number of players. The remaining Defuse cards are then also put back in the deck. A turn order is decided upon any trivial condition.

Each player may then play as many cards from their hand as they like on their turn, or choose not to do so, before drawing a card. Players are not to tell any other player what cards are in their hand. Played cards are put into a discard pile.

If a player draws an Exploding Kitten card, they must show it immediately and they are out of the game, unless they have a Defuse card. The last player still in the game wins.

Development 

As of 2015, Exploding Kittens stood as the third-biggest campaign ever mounted on Kickstarter. It launched with an initial goal of US$10,000, but by the end of the first day, the campaign had raised $1,333,586 from nearly 35,000 backers. By Day 4, it had raised more than $3,500,000 from more than 91,000 backers. Ultimately, it raised $8.7 million from 219,382 backers.

On February 3, 2015, achievements were announced in lieu of stretch goals because the game designers did not want to delay production or distribution of the game to backers. As of February 16, 2015, 30 achievements had been unlocked and the second stretch goal (Unlock 20 Achievements) and third stretch goal (Unlock 30 Achievements) were completed. With the first stretch goal accomplished, the company expanded the NSFW deck to a full stand-alone game. The second stretch goal gave all backers an upgraded storage box that holds two full decks of cards, and the third and final stretch goal includes a Kickstarter-exclusive surprise in the box.

Exploding Kittens began shipping to backers in late July 2015. 

At the 2018 South by SouthWest festival, Exploding Kittens maintained a booth that displayed merchandise and had interactive components such as a large kitten vending machine.

Expansions 
The creators released four expansion packs, most of which require a copy of Exploding Kittens to play.

In October 2016, the Imploding Kittens pack was released. It increased the top number of players from 5 to 6, and added 20 new cards.  It introduced the cards/mechanics of Alter the Future, Draw from the Bottom, and Reverse from the mobile game, and the new Imploding Kitten card/mechanic.

On July 30, 2017, the Exploding Kittens Party Pack went on sale exclusively at Target. The party pack is an update to the original game that allows for up to 10 players. It removes the Attack card/mechanic and replaces it with the Slap mechanic from the mobile game. The mechanics introduced in the Imploding Kittens expansion are also included. The Exploding Kittens display at Target stores also contained a hidden shelf containing an update for the Cards Against Humanity game dubbed the Hidden Compartment Pack. This pack contains 5 cards of the new mechanic, Blind as a Bat, and 15 new white CAH cards.

On October 9, 2018, the Streaking Kittens expansion pack was released. Its 15 new cards/mechanics included Mark, Swap Top and Bottom, Catomic Bomb, Curse of the Cat Butt, Garbage Collector, Super Skip, and the Streaking Kitten.

The Barking Kittens expansion was released on June 5, 2020. Its 20 cards introduced Bury, Alter the Future Now, I'll Take That, Share the Future, Tower of Power, Personal Attack (3x), Potluck and Barking Kittens.

Mobile versions 
Microsoft's Zo chatbot offered a single-player version of Exploding Kittens.

In January 2016, a multiplayer version of the game was released on the iOS platform with new content not found in the original game. In April 2016, the mobile version was also released onto the Android platform, and allowed for cross-platform play between all mobile versions. It was also available on Nintendo Switch.

The Attack and Nope cards from the original card game were not released in the mobile versions on iOS and Android.

Netflix's free-to-play mobile game "Exploding Kittens - The Game" was announced in April 2022 and was launched on May 31. The game is available to its users at no additional cost and has no in-app purchases.

TV series adaptation 
In April 2022, an animated streaming television series was announced by Netflix with King of the Hill creators Mike Judge and Greg Daniels as executive producers. Additional game mechanics and cards tied to the show will be added to the mobile game at a later date. The series is scheduled for a 2023 release.

References

External links 
 
 
 Exploding Kittens at Kickstarter

Dedicated deck card games
Card games introduced in 2015
Kickstarter-funded tabletop games